Härnösand Cathedral serves the Diocese of Härnösand of the Church of Sweden.
It is located in Härnösand in Västernorrland County, Sweden.
From atop the 46 metres tall tower, the entire town of Härnösand can be viewed.

History
Härnösand city's first church was built 1593. The four chandeliers are from the 17th century. In 1721 the church was burned down by Russian troops, and a new church was erected, and that church was eventually destroyed. The present church was inaugurated on 28 June 1846 and built according to plans by Johan Adolf Hawerman (1812-1885). The present church is located in the same location as the original and is Sweden's smallest cathedral.

The altar painting is by David von Coln (1689–1763). The baptismal font is a Spanish rococo work in silver and manufactured 1777. The organ was built in 1975 by the Danish firm of Bruno Christensen & Sønner Orgelbyggeri and has 57 stops. The organ facade is from the 1700s Cahman organ that was saved from the original church.

Gallery

References

Diocese of Härnösand
Churches completed in 1846
19th-century Church of Sweden church buildings
Church buildings with domes
Lutheran cathedrals in Sweden
Churches in Västernorrland County
Härnösand
Carillons
Churches in the Diocese of Härnösand
1846 establishments in Sweden